What the Butler Saw is a 1924 British silent comedy film directed by George Dewhurst and starring Irene Rich, Pauline Garon and Guy Newall.

Cast
 Irene Rich as Mrs. Barrington  
 Pauline Garon as Joan Wyckham 
 Guy Newall as Barrington  
 Cecil Morton York as Professor Shall  
 A.B. Imeson as Sir Charles Foden  
 Drusilla Wills as Sophie Foden  
 John MacAndrews as Pink  
 A. Bromley Davenport as General Dunlop  
 Peggy Patterson as Miss Dunlop  
 Cecil Mannering as Dr. Boggins 
 Hilda Anthony as Mrs. Flemyng-Smith

References

Bibliography
 Goble, Alan. The Complete Index to Literary Sources in Film. Walter de Gruyter, 1999.

External links
 

1924 films
1924 comedy films
British comedy films
British silent feature films
Films directed by George Dewhurst
Films set in England
British black-and-white films
1920s English-language films
1920s British films
Silent comedy films